The OSE class A.101 (Krupp V60), also known as Κruppάκι-Κruppάκια (Kroupaki, "Little Krupp"), due to its small size, only 10 meters long, is, along with the class A.201, the oldest series of locomotive operated by TRAINOSE and is part fleet of the OSE. It is a diesel-powered, built in 1962 by Krupp for SEK and was put into operation at OSE in 1971, with its foundation. It has a MTW GTO 6 diesel engine with combined power of 478 kW and reaching speeds of up to 70 km / h in freight and local trains, and 30 in shunting operations.

Class A.101 locomotives are based in the Rentis depot, where they are preserved. They had three axles that were coupled with rods, with 950 hop, made from a fully welded frame and weighing 51 tons. The driver's cab was soundproofed with good visibility for operation to either direction. It was one of the most successful choices of the Greek Railways.

Route 
Today only 2 such locomotives are available for shunting in Northern Greece, and specifically in Thessaloniki. The A116 works and more rarely the A110 only for wagon maneuvers.

List of locomotives 
The following table summarizes the class

History 
As early as 1951, the Deutsche Bundesbahn (DB) had designed for shunting purposes a type of diesel-hydraulic locomotive, named  V60, which was later numbered 260, 261 and 362, which numbered 962 machines, manufactured by nearly all German industries: Krupp, Henschel, Esslingen, Krauss-Maffei, etc. As early as 1955, they were delivered in Norway, Yugoslavia (later Croatia), Belgium, Turkey and Israel. In Greece, SEK purchased between the years 1962-1968 30 such locomotives, numbered A101 - A130.

Livery 

The livery consist of a white vertical stripe on a brown color covering the largest surface of the vehicles.

References 

 OSE locomotives
C locomotives 

Diesel locomotives of Greece
Standard gauge locomotives of Greece